Naiqoro Passage is located near Kadavu Island in Fiji and is one of the main inlets to the Great Astrolabe Reef.

Bodies of water of Fiji